A military junior college (MJC) is a military-style junior college in the United States and one of the three major categories of the Army ROTC schools that allows cadets to become commissioned officers in the U.S. Army reserve components in two years, instead of the usual four, through the Early Commissioning Program (ECP). They also offer Service Academy preparatory programs that allow qualified students to earn an appointment to the U.S. Service Academies upon their successful completion of this demanding one-year program at a MJC.

Schools

Four institutions are considered military junior colleges:
 Georgia Military College, Milledgeville, Georgia, founded in 1879, includes a liberal arts junior college, a high school, and a middle school.
 Marion Military Institute, Marion, Alabama, founded in 1842, is the state military college of Alabama and nation's oldest military junior college.
 New Mexico Military Institute, Roswell, New Mexico, founded in 1891, is a four-year high school and a two-year junior college.
 Valley Forge Military Academy and College, Wayne, Pennsylvania, was founded in 1928, offers a co-ed two-year junior college program, as well as a military boarding school for young men grades seven through twelve. It is the only private military junior college.

Former MJCs
 Kemper Military School, Boonville, Missouri, founded in 1844, filed for bankruptcy and closed in 2002.
 Wentworth Military Academy and College, Lexington, Missouri, founded in 1880, closed in 2017 due to financial difficulties.

References

See also
Early Commissioning Program
Senior Military College
Army Reserve Officers' Training Corps

 
Types of university or college